In number theory, Kaprekar's routine is an iterative algorithm that, with each iteration, takes a natural number in a given number base, creates two new numbers by sorting the digits of its number by descending and ascending order, and subtracts the second from the first to yield the natural number for the next iteration. It is named after its inventor, the Indian mathematician D. R. Kaprekar.

Kaprekar showed that in the case of four-digit numbers in base 10, if the initial number has at least two distinct digits, after seven iterations this process always yields the number 6174, which is now known as Kaprekar's constant.

Definition and properties
The algorithm is as follows:

 Choose any natural number  in a given number base . This is the first number of the sequence.
These numbers may have leading zeros, which are discarded (or alternatively, retained). Subtract  to produce the next number of the sequence.
 Repeat step 2.

The sequence is called a Kaprekar sequence and the function   is the Kaprekar mapping. Some numbers map to themselves; these are the fixed points of the Kaprekar mapping, and are called Kaprekar's constants. Zero is a Kaprekar's constant for all bases , and so is called a trivial Kaprekar's constants. All other Kaprekar's constant are nontrivial Kaprekar's constants.

For example, in base 10, starting with 3524,

 

 

 

 

with 6174 as a Kaprekar's constant.

All Kaprekar sequences will either reach one of these fixed points or will result in a repeating cycle. Either way, the end result is reached in a fairly small number of steps.

Note that the numbers  and  have the same digit sum and hence the same remainder modulo .

When leading zeroes are retained, only repdigits lead to the trivial Kaprekar's constant.

Families of Kaprekar's constants
In base 4, it can easily be shown that all numbers of the form 3021, 310221, 31102221, 3...111...02...222...1 (where the length of the "1" sequence and the length of the "2" sequence are the same) are fixed points of the Kaprekar mapping.

In base 10, it can easily be shown that all numbers of the form 6174, 631764, 63317664, 6...333...17...666...4 (where the length of the "3" sequence and the length of the "6" sequence are the same) are fixed points of the Kaprekar mapping.

b = 2k
It can be shown that all natural numbers

are fixed points of the Kaprekar mapping in even base  for all natural numbers .

Kaprekar's constants and cycles of the Kaprekar mapping for specific base b
All numbers are expressed in base , using A−Z to represent digit values 10 to 35.

Kaprekar's constants in base 10

Numbers of length four digits

In 1949 D. R. Kaprekar discovered that if the above process is applied to base 10 numbers of four digits, the resulting sequence will almost always converge to the value 6174 in at most eight iterations, except for a small set of initial numbers which converge instead to 0. The number 6174 is the first Kaprekar's constant to be discovered, and thus is sometimes known as Kaprekar's constant.

The set of numbers that converge to zero depends on whether leading zeros are  discarded (the usual formulation) or are retained (as in Kaprekar's original formulation).

In the usual formulation, there are 77 four-digit numbers that converge to zero, for example 2111. However, in Kaprekar's original formulation the leading zeros are retained, and only repdigits such as 1111 or 2222 map to zero. This contrast is illustrated below:

Below is a flowchart. Leading zeros are retained, however the only difference when leading zeros are discarded is that instead of 0999 connecting to 8991, we get 999 connecting to 0.

Numbers of length three digits

If the Kaprekar routine is applied to numbers of three digits in base 10, the resulting sequence will almost always converge to the value 495 in at most six iterations, except for a small set of initial numbers which converge instead to 0.

The set of numbers that converge to zero depends on whether leading zeros are discarded (the usual formulation) or are retained (as in Kaprekar's original formulation). In the usual formulation, there are 60 three-digit numbers that converge to zero, for example 211. However, in Kaprekar's original formulation the leading zeros are retained, and only repdigits such as 111 or 222 map to zero.

Below is a flowchart. Leading zeros are retained, however the only difference when leading zeros are discarded is that instead of 099 connecting to 891, we get 99 connecting to 0.

Other digit lengths
For digit lengths other than three or four (in base 10), the routine may terminate at one of several fixed points or may enter one of several cycles instead, depending on the starting value of the sequence. See the table in the section above for base 10 fixed points and cycles.

The number of cycles increases rapidly with larger digit lengths, and all but a small handful of these cycles are of length three. For example, for 20-digit numbers in base 10, there are fourteen constants (cycles of length one) and ninety-six cycles of length greater than one, all but two of which are of length three. Odd digit lengths produce fewer different end results than even digit lengths.

Programming example
The example below implements the Kaprekar mapping described in the definition above to search for Kaprekar's constants and cycles in Python.

Leading zeroes discarded
def get_digits(x, b):
    digits = []
    while x > 0:
        digits.append(x % b)
        x = x // b
    return digits
    
def form_number(digits, b):
    result = 0
    for i in range(0, len(digits)):
        result = result * b + digits[i]
    return result

def kaprekar_map(x, b):
    descending = form_number(sorted(get_digits(x, b), reverse=True), b)
    ascending = form_number(sorted(get_digits(x, b)), b)
    return descending - ascending
    
def kaprekar_cycle(x, b):
    x = int (str(x), b)
    seen = []
    while x not in seen:
        seen.append(x)
        x = kaprekar_map(x, b)
    cycle = []
    while x not in cycle:
        cycle.append(x)
        x = kaprekar_map(x, b)
    return cycle

Leading zeroes retained
def digit_count(x, b):
    count = 0
    while x > 0:
        count = count + 1
        x = x // b
    return count
    
def get_digits(x, b, init_k):
    k = digit_count(x, b)
    digits = []
    while x > 0:
        digits.append(x % b)
        x = x // b
    for i in range(k, init_k):
        digits.append(0)
    return digits
    
def form_number(digits, b):
    result = 0
    for i in range(0, len(digits)):
        result = result * b + digits[i]
    return result
    
def kaprekar_map(x, b, init_k):
    descending = form_number(sorted(get_digits(x, b, init_k), reverse=True), b)
    ascending = form_number(sorted(get_digits(x, b, init_k)), b)
    return descending - ascending
    
def kaprekar_cycle(x, b):
    x = int (str(x), b)
    init_k = digit_count(x, b)
    seen = []
    while x not in seen:
        seen.append(x)
        x = kaprekar_map(x, b, init_k)
    cycle = []
    while x not in cycle:
        cycle.append(x)
        x = kaprekar_map(x, b, init_k)
    return cycle

See also
 Arithmetic dynamics
 Dudeney number
 Factorion
 Happy number
 Kaprekar number
 Meertens number
 Narcissistic number
 Perfect digit-to-digit invariant
 Perfect digital invariant
 Sum-product number
 Sorting algorithm

Citations

References

External links

 
 Working link to YouTube
 Sample (Perl) code to walk any four-digit number to Kaprekar's Constant

Arithmetic dynamics
Base-dependent integer sequences
Sorting algorithms